Associated Television International is a television production company mainly specializing in American and international syndication through production and distribution. The company is based out of a facility on Wilshire Boulevard in Los Angeles, mainly distributing and producing their own programming.

Filmography

See also
 Illusion (yacht)

References

External links
 

 
American companies established in 1982
1982 establishments in California
Mass media companies established in 1982
Companies based in Los Angeles
Film production companies of the United States
Television production companies of the United States
Entertainment companies based in California
Television syndication distributors
Hancock Park, Los Angeles